Zvonimir Vučković (1916—2004) was a Yugoslav Chetnik military commander holding the rank of Major and vojvoda during World War II and one of the closest associates of Draža Mihailović.

Vučković was born in Bijeljina in Croatian family Prkić in 1916. After his father died when he was four, Vučkovićs mother married Aleksandar Vučković from Vranje. Zvonimir completed military academy in Belgrade and became military officer of the Royal Yugoslav Army, first in Zagreb, then in Belgrade. When he heard that Yugoslav government signed tripartite pact with Nazi Germany on 25 March 1941, Vučković immediately left the country to join Greek Army struggling against Fascist Italy as an act of protest. After his own country was invaded by the Axis he returned and in June 1941 joined guerilla units of the Yugoslav Army in the Fatherland, commonly known as Chetniks.

In September he established the Takovo Chetnik Detachment and became its commander. On 29 September 1941 he commanded his detachment, supported by one unit of communist Partisans, and liberated Gornji Milanovac. He later became a commander of the 1st Ravna Gora Corps. He left Yugoslavia as member of the Chetnik political and military mission at the end of the Operation Halyard, also organized by him, and spent the rest of his life in US.

Early life 
Zvonimir Vučković was born in Bijeljina on 6 July 1916 in the ethnic Croatian family, of father Petar Prkić who hailed from Vareš and mother Anka from Makarska. After Zvonimir's father died in 1920, his mother married Aleksandar Vučković from Vranje. In 1930 Zvonimir's stepfather was transferred to Zagreb. In 1931, Zvonimir was accepted into Military Academy in Belgrade, when he was 16. He completed his education in Zagreb, where his parents lived, he served in 30th Artillery Division "Prince Tomislav". In September 1939 Zvonimir's stepfather died when Germany signed the Ribbentrop-Molotov treaty with the Soviet Union. Right after the funeral of his stepfather, based on his request Zvonimir was transferred to Belgrade to Cavalrly Artillery Division of the Royal Guard. He was a very good friend with Momčilo Smiljanić and Savo Konavlinka.

World War II 
As an act of protest when Yugoslav government signed the tripartite pact with Nazi Germany on 25 March 1941, Vučković left the country together with two of his associates to join the Greek Army struggling against Fascist Italy. After the Axis invaded Yugoslavia, Vučković returned to German-occupied Serbia and went to Ravna Gora on 27 June 1941 and joined the Yugoslav Army in the Fatherland guerilla forces known as Chetniks. Following Mihailović's orders, Vučković established a new detachment (Takovo Chetnik Detachment) in the region of Takovo County which was his zone of operation in September 1941. The code name of Vučković was Felix. On 29 September 1941 Lieutenant Vučković and his Takovo Chetnik Detachment together with one unit of Partisans attacked and captured Gornji Milanovac. In 1942 he was awarded the Order of the Star of Karađorđe.

Vučković was commander of the 1st Ravna Gora Corps. The official journal of the 1st Ravna Gora Corps was Ravnogorac published since October 1943.

Vučković commanded 2,000 Chetniks that secured the Ba Congress held between 25 and 28 January 1944.

Vučković was one of the main organizers of Operation Halyard conducted from 2 August to 27 December 1944. After the last Allied pilots were evacuated Mihailović sent Vučković with the political-military Chetnik mission to Allied HQ in Bari. The other members were Adam Pribićević, Vladimir Belajčić and Ivan Kovač.

Post WWII 
After the war Vučković went to France and then to United States, where he worked as an engineer. From 1952 to 1956, he was a member of the editorial team of Democratic Тhought headed by Adam Pribićević. He published his texts in Voice of Canadian Serbs and Our Word of Desimir Tošić. Vučković died on 21 December 2004 in California, on the same day that the Assembly of the Republic of Serbia adopted the law which equalized rights of Partisans and Chetniks. Vučković was elected as member of an association known as Liberation. His book of war memories was published in 1977 and received an award Slobodan Jovanović by Association of Serbian Writers and Artists from London as the best book published in that year.

Bibliography 
After the war Vučković published his war memoirs which are generally accepted as reliable.

Vučković's bibliography includes:

Notes

Sources

Further reading 

1916 births
2004 deaths
Chetnik personnel of World War II
Croats of Bosnia and Herzegovina
Royal Yugoslav Army personnel